Caloplaca ahtii is a species of corticolous (bark-dwelling) crustose lichen in the family Teloschistaceae. Found in Europe, it was formally described as a new species in 1994 by Ulrik Søchting. The type locality was in Finland, and the type specimen was found growing on Populus. The species epithet honours Finnish lichenologist Teuvo Ahti. In 2022, the species was documented from North-Western European Russia. It is also found in North America.

See also
List of Caloplaca species

References

ahtii
Lichen species
Lichens described in 1994
Lichens of Europe
Lichens of North America